The 1972–73 New York Islanders season was the first season in the franchise's history. At the beginning of 1972, Gordie Howe was offered the job as first head coach of the New York Islanders, but turned it down. The Islanders were coached by Phil Goyette (6–38–4) and Earl Ingarfield (6–22–2). Overall, the team finished in last place with an appalling 12–60–6 record, unable to qualify for the playoffs.

Offseason

NHL Draft

NHL Expansion Draft

Regular season

With the impending start of the World Hockey Association in the fall of 1972, the upstart league had plans to place its New York team in the brand-new Nassau Veterans Memorial Coliseum in Nassau County. However, Nassau County officials did not consider the WHA a professional league and wanted nothing to do with the upstart New York Raiders. The only legal way to keep the Raiders out of the Coliseum was to get an NHL team to play there, so William Shea, who had helped bring the New York Mets to the area a decade earlier, was pressed into service once again. Shea found a receptive ear in league president Clarence Campbell, who did not want the additional competition in the New York area. So, despite having expanded to 14 teams just two years before, the NHL hastily awarded a Long Island-based franchise to clothing manufacturer Roy Boe, owner of the American Basketball Association's New York Nets. A second expansion franchise was awarded to Atlanta (the Flames) at the same time to balance the schedule. The new team was widely expected to take the Long Island Ducks name used by an Eastern Hockey League franchise; the more geographically expansive "New York Islanders" came largely as a surprise.

The fledgling Islanders, who were soon nicknamed the Isles by the local newspapers, had an extra burden to pay in the form of a $4 million territorial fee to the nearby New York Rangers. True to their name, the New York Islanders officially represent New York (city and state), with their nickname and logo denoting their current arena location and fan heartbed; but their support has also naturally come from the boroughs, upstate, Connecticut, and elsewhere in the metro area. This geographical backdrop set the stage for one of the NHL's fiercest and most celebrated regional rivalries.

While the Islanders secured veteran forward Ed Westfall from the Boston Bruins in the 1972 NHL Expansion Draft, junior league star Billy Harris in the 1972 NHL Amateur Draft, and a few other respectable players, several other draftees jumped to the WHA. Unlike most other expansion teams' general managers, Islanders' GM Bill Torrey didn't make many trades for veteran players in the early years. Rather than pursue a "win now" strategy of getting a few veterans to boost attendance (a tactic which proved disastrous for many teams in the long run), Torrey was committed to building through the draft.

In the team's first season, young players such as goaltender Billy Smith (the team's second pick in the expansion draft) and forwards Bob Nystrom and Lorne Henning were given chances to prove themselves in the NHL. However, this young and inexperienced expansion team posted a record of 12–60–6, one of the worst in NHL history. The lone highlight of the season came on January 18, when the lowly Islanders upset the defending Stanley Cup champion Boston Bruins on the road 9–7.

Phil Goyette was fired midway through the season, and replaced with Earl Ingarfield.

Final standings

Schedule and results

Player statistics

Forwards
Note: GP = Games played; G = Goals; A = Assists; Pts = Points; PIM = Penalty minutes

Defencemen
Note: GP = Games played; G = Goals; A = Assists; Pts = Points; PIM = Penalty minutes

Goaltending
Note: GP= Games played; MIN = Minutes; W = Wins; L = Losses; T = Ties; SO = Shutouts; GA = Goals against; GAA = Goals against average

References
 Islanders on Hockey Database

New York Islanders seasons
New York Islanders
New York Islanders
New York Islanders
New York Islanders